The 2002 World Wrestling Federation (WWF) draft lottery, the initial WWF draft, took place at Penn State University in State College, Pennsylvania, on March 25. The first half of the draft was televised live on TNN for two hours, as part of the WWF's program, Raw. The second half was conducted over the Internet on WWF's official website, WWF.com. There were thirty draft picks, with sixty wrestlers drafted overall by co-owners of the WWF, onto their respective brands, Raw and SmackDown!. The remaining wrestlers were divided randomly in a draft lottery, with each brand receiving a grand total of thirty wrestlers.

Background
On March 17, 2002, World Wrestling Federation (WWF) Chairman Vince McMahon announced that the company would represent its business of professional wrestling through two distinct brands named after the WWF's weekly television programs, Raw and SmackDown!. This was a direct result of the acquisition of World Championship Wrestling (WCW) and Extreme Championship Wrestling (ECW), the WWF's primary rival corporations throughout the 1990s, that resulted in the addition of numerous talent to the extensive WWF roster.

In terms of storyline, Ric Flair had become fifty percent owner of the WWF following Survivor Series 2001 after Shane and Stephanie had sold their stocks to him in order to purchase WCW and ECW, respectively, a campaign to launch The Invasion. Original full WWF owner Vince McMahon detested having to share his creation with Flair and sought to dissolve their partnership. Simultaneously, Flair was engaged in a feud with The Undertaker and wanted to conclude it with a bout at WrestleMania X8. However, the WWF Board of Directors would only allow the match if Flair returned full ownership back to McMahon. Flair agreed, but the Board stated that it would review the WWF's status and ownership following WrestleMania.

In continuation with storyline, the Board's ultimate decision was to split the entire WWF roster into two separate entities, with McMahon in control of the SmackDown! brand and Flair in control of the Raw brand. All WWF wrestlers were to be assigned to a brand based on random selections conducted through a mock-draft lottery. On the March 25, 2002 episode of Raw, the WWF Draft was held, in which each owner received a total of thirty picks.

Selections
On the March 25, 2002, episode of Raw, Vince McMahon won a coin toss to determine who would receive the first draft selection.

Notes:
Picks No. 1–20 were made live on Raw
Picks No. 21–57 were conducted via lottery on the WWF's website

Undrafted
Several wrestlers remained undrafted for various reasons.

Aftermath
The brand extension was officially enforced on April 1, 2002. Stone Cold Steve Austin was made exempt from the draft by Linda McMahon, but later opted to sign with Raw. A month later, the WWF was sued by the World Wildlife Fund over the WWF initialism. This resulted in the company being renamed from "World Wrestling Federation Entertainment, Inc." to simply "World Wrestling Entertainment, Inc.", which caused all of the WWF's assets to be properly renamed and branded. The Flair and McMahon feud came to an end on the edition of June 10, 2002 of Raw, when McMahon became the sole owner of WWE by defeating Flair in a No Holds Barred match. Following the situations with the brand extension and name change, by having two brands in place, the WWE was able to increase the number of live events held each year from 200 to 350, including tours in several new international markets. Even after the end of the first brand extension in 2011, WWE continued to have two touring live event shows. The brand extension returned in 2016.

After McMahon became the sole owner, the owner role was replaced by "General Managers". For Raw, he announced the new General Manager for Raw would be Eric Bischoff, and for SmackDown!, Stephanie McMahon. On the same night when he announced Stephanie as new General Manager, he also stated that a free agent period has started and any Superstar could sign with the other brand. This continued until the fall of 2002. On the September 23 edition of Raw, Bischoff announced that the roster was frozen and the only way for a wrestler to move was to ask for a trade.

References

History of WWE
WWE draft
2002 in professional wrestling
Professional wrestling in Pennsylvania
Events in Pennsylvania
March 2002 events in the United States